The 2010 IPC Powerlifting World Championships was a competition for male and female athletes with a disability. It was held in Kuala Lumpur, Malaysia and ran from 25 to 31 July 2010.

Vietnamese powerlifter Lê Văn Công was the winner of the silver medal in the men's 48 kg event but he was stripped of his medal after anti-doping rule violation.

Medalists

Men

Women

2006 Results
 http://www.feddf.es/archivos/calendario/185.pdf - 2006 Men and Women Results
 http://en.olympic.cn/news/world/2006-04-29/847504.html - 2006

References 

 https://web.archive.org/web/20160819115859/https://www.paralympic.org/sites/default/files/document/120629134625840_2010_IPC_PO_WCH_All_Men_weight_categories.pdf
 https://web.archive.org/web/20190605152637/https://www.paralympic.org/sites/default/files/document/120629134735463_2010_IPC_PO_WCH_All_Women_weight_categories_0.pdf

World Para Powerlifting Championships
2010 in weightlifting
IPC Powerlifting World Championships
IPC Powerlifting World Championships
IPC Powerlifting World Championships